The 2009 Ginetta Junior Championship was the fifth season of the Ginetta Junior Championship. The season began at Brands Hatch on 4 April 2009 and concluded after 20 races over 10 events also at Brands Hatch on 4 October 2009. This was the last season that the drivers raced Ginetta G20 cars. They were replaced with the G40 in 2010.

Teams and drivers
 All drivers raced in Ginetta G20s.

Race calendar and results
All rounds were held in the United Kingdom.

Drivers' Championship
(key)

References

External links
 Official website
 tsl-timing

Ginetta Junior Championship
Ginetta Junior Championship seasons